Terrorism in Sudan has occurred in Sudan since the recent war. The Sudanese government, however, persists in fighting against terrorism in the country.

Sudan has made progress in shutting down terrorism inside its borders. Sudan’s terrorist connection is not new and the country has been on the United States list of state sponsors of terrorism since August 1993. Sudan has been under diplomatic sanctions by the United Nations since 1996.

Sudan is in a strategic position to export its Islamic revolution because of its borders with both Egypt and Libya and with six African countries, including Ethiopia, which has a large and impoverished Muslim population.

Terrorism was introduced to Sudan in the early 1990s when Osama Bin Ladin and his followers came to the country and built a training camp infrastructure as well as setting up a business and finance network.

Terrorist groups in Sudan 

Sudan People's Liberation Army (SPLA) has been accused by Africa Watch of using terrorist methods in their fight for autonomy. In 2001, the SPLA attacked civilian oil targets, killing a significant number of civilians and aid workers, as well selling rockets to civilians.

Training camps 

Many of the terrorist groups have a number of training camps in the country. Sudan, being the third largest African country (after the secession of South Sudan in 2011) is a common place to hide a terrorist training center. Certain locations are known for training particular groups or
people from certain countries. Camp al-Maokil near Shendi was for training Algerians and Tunisians. In early May 1990, some 60 Arabs from North Africa, France, and Belgium began to train in the Shambat district of Khartoum. In the al-Khalafiyya area north of Khartoum training took place for the Algerian Islamic Salvation Army and the Armed Islamic Group. In Akhil al-Awliya on the banks of the Blue Nile, south of Khartoum more than 500 Palestinians, Syrians and Jordanians were trained.

List of terrorist incidents in Sudan 

List of terrorist incidents in Sudan since 1970:

References

Sources 
http://www.sudantribune.com/spip.php?article30535

https://web.archive.org/web/20091004174556/http://www.sudan.net/news/press/postedr/43.shtml

External links
http://www2.canada.com/topics/news/story.html?id=1461349 Canadian accused of terrorism in Sudan denied passport
http://www.mediamonitors.net/mosaddeq16.html United States Terrorism in the Sudan
http://www.survivorsrightsinternational.org/sri_news/SRI-Khar.pdf Eradication of Terrorism Forestalled by Khartoum's Genocidal Policies and Oppressive Rule
United States Department of State Strikes on Terrorist-Related Facilities in Afghanistan and Sudan August 20, 1998
Africa and the war on terrorism By John Davis 

 
Sudan
Human rights abuses in Sudan